"Like You" is a song by American rapper Bow Wow featuring singer Ciara. It was written by Jermaine Dupri, Jaron Alston, and Johnta Austin, and produced by Dupri and Bryan Michael Cox for Bow Wow's fourth album Wanted (2005). The song includes the keyboard chord of New Edition's "I'm Leaving You Again" written by Jaron Alson, Ricky Bell, and Ralph Tresvant. "Like You" was released as the album's second single on July 12, 2005, reaching atop the Billboard Hot R&B/Hip-Hop Songs chart and peaking at number three on the Hot 100, giving Bow Wow his second top 10 hit on that chart, as was Ciara's fifth. The song also charted in the top 40 in countries like Ireland, Germany and the UK. To date, "Like You" remains Bow Wow's highest charting song.

Commercial performance
"Like You" debuted at number 63 on US Billboard Hot 100 for the week of August 6, 2005, while "Let Me Hold You" was in the top 5. It moved fifteen spots to number 49 for the week of August 13, 2005. It entered the top 40 for the week of August 20, 2005, by moving twenty-four spots to number 25. It moved thirteen spots to number 12 for the week of August 27, 2005. It peaked at number three for the week of October 1, 2005, and stayed there for two weeks. It stayed on the chart for twenty-one weeks. It surpassed "Let Me Hold You" as Bow Wow's highest charting song on the Hot 100, giving him his second top 10 hit, as well as give Ciara her fifth top 10 hit.

Music video
The video was directed by Bryan Barber and set in a high-rise apartment building. In the video, each of the two performers already have a significant other. Bow Wow lives one floor above Ciara and they are infatuated with each other. While in the process of getting ready to meet their respective dates, they rap and sing to each other and have a sequence of talking to each other on the phone. Bow Wow and Ciara encounter each other on the elevator while leaving their apartments and they have an imaginary moment on the elevator. When the elevator reaches the lobby, they go outside to meet their significant others; never acting upon the moment. Actor and comedian Alex Thomas Jr. plays the valet in the video.

Live performance
Bow Wow and Ciara performed "Like You" at the 2005 American Music Awards on November 22, 2005, as part of a medley with Omarion's "O" and Bow Wow's "Let Me Hold You".

Track listings

US 12-inch vinyl
A1. "Like You" (album version) – 3:25
A2. "Like You" (instrumental) – 3:25
B1. "Like You" (acappella) – 2:59
B2. "Like You" (instrumental with background vocals) – 3:25

European CD single
 "Like You" (album version) – 3:25
 "Like You" (Octave Remix) – 3:10

UK CD1
 "Like You" (album version) – 3:25
 "Like You" (The Paduan's Remix) – 3:42

UK CD2 and Australian CD single
 "Like You" (album version)
 "Like You" (Octave Remix)
 "Like You" (instrumental)
 "The Don, the Dutch"
 "Like You" (video)

UK 12-inch vinyl
A1. "Like You" (album version)
A2. "Like You" (instrumental)
A3. "Like You" (Paduan Remix)
B1. "Like You" (Octave Remix)
B2. "The Don, the Dutch"

Charts

Weekly charts

Year-end charts

Certifications

Release history

See also
 List of number-one R&B singles of 2005 (U.S.)
 List of Billboard number-one rap singles of the 2000s

References

2005 singles
2005 songs
2006 singles
Bow Wow (rapper) songs
Ciara songs
Columbia Records singles
Sony BMG singles
Contemporary R&B ballads
Music videos directed by Bryan Barber
Song recordings produced by Jermaine Dupri
Songs written by Jermaine Dupri
Songs written by Johntá Austin
Songs written by Ricky Bell (singer)